Clifton Bush II (born 1 September 1970) is an American-New Zealand former professional basketball player who played the majority of his career in the New Zealand National Basketball League (NBL). He also spent six seasons playing in Iceland, and had short stints playing in Argentina for Estudiantes de Olavarría, and in the Australian NBL for the New Zealand Breakers.

College career
Bush grew up in Arkansas and played four years of college basketball for the Central Arkansas Bears. As a sophomore in 1989–90, he started all 35 games for the Bears and averaged 16.8 points per game (587 total points) on .498 field goal shooting (220-of-442).

As a junior in 1990–91, Bush started in 33 of the Bears' 34 games, and scored a school single-season high of 682 points, good for 20.1 points per game (ranked eighth in single-season scoring averages) on .560 field goal shooting (263-of-470) and .563 three-point shooting (58-of-103). He also recorded 280 rebounds (8.2 pg) and 62 steals (1.8 pg).

As a senior in 1991–92, Bush started in all 33 games for the Bears and averaged 19.0 points per game (626 total points) on .499 field goal shooting (248-of-497). He also recorded 59 steals (1.8 pg).

In 2004, Bush was inducted into the University of Central Arkansas Sports Hall of Honor.

Professional career

Iceland and New Zealand (1995–2003)
Bush began his professional career in Iceland with Snæfell in 1995. He spent one season with the club before joining Breiðablik for the 1996–97 season where he averaged 24.7 points and 12.3 rebounds in 11 games.

In early 1997, an agent asked if he or any of the eight players he lived with wanted to go to New Zealand for the off-season. Three days later, Bush arrived in Christchurch to play for the Canterbury Rams. In 20 games for the Rams in 1997, he averaged 24.4 points, 9.0 rebounds, 2.3 assists and 2.6 steals per game.

Bush re-joined Snæfell for the 1997–98 season, and returned to New Zealand in 1998 to once again play for the Canterbury Rams. He played in 40 games for the Rams between 1998 and 1999, helping the club reach the playoffs both years.

For the 1999–2000 season, Bush returned to Iceland to play for KFÍ, where he averaged a then career-high 26.3 points in 17 games. On October 19, 1999, Bush played 59 minutes and scored 55 points in a quadruple overtime victory against Skallagrímur. On February 13, 2000, he suffered a knee injury in a game against Njarðvík and wound up missing the rest of the season.

For the 2000 New Zealand NBL season, Bush played for the Waikato Warriors and helped them finish second with a 12–4 record. However, the team stumbled in their semi-final clash with third-seeded Nelson, losing 105–100, with Bush scoring just two points in 24 minutes off the bench. Overall, he appeared in 14 games (13 regular season, one playoff) and averaged 13.4 points per game.

Bush again played in Iceland for the 2000–01 season, averaging 21.8 points and 14.1 rebounds in 11 games for Þór Akureyri. His best season as a professional came in 2001 while playing for the Waikato Titans. He averaged a career-high 27.4 points per game and subsequently earned the league's scoring title. He also earned Most Outstanding Forward honors, and was named to the league's All-Star Five. Then, to cap off a career-best season, Bush helped lead Waikato to their maiden championship with 26 points in a 112–97 grand final win over the Wellington Saints.

In October 2001, Bush had a five-game stint with Argentinean club Estudiantes de Olavarría. For the 2002 New Zealand NBL season, he joined the Manawatu Jets. He appeared in all 16 regular season games for the Jets, averaging 23.3 points and 10.5 rebounds per game and helping the team reach the playoffs with a fourth-place finish and a 9–7 record. In their semi-final clash with first-seeded Nelson, the Jets lost 83–64 despite Bush's 18-point game. That year, Bush tried out for a spot on the Tall Blacks as a naturalised player.

His final Icelandic season came in 2002–03 with Snæfell, his third stint with the club. Having played in the Icelandic second division both previous seasons with Snæfell, the club played in the top division in 2002–03. He played in 22 games during the season, averaging 23.7 points, 12.1 rebounds, 2.3 steals and 1.5 steals in 39.1 minutes per game. In 2003, Bush joined the Canterbury Knights of the Conference Basketball League, New Zealand's second-tier competition. With the Knights, he helped lead the team to the CBL Final, where he recorded 13 points and 12 rebounds in the Knights' 80–69 championship win over Hutt Valley. He subsequently earned CBL All-Star Five honors.

Continued NBL career (2004–2009)
In 2004, Bush returned to the National Basketball League where he re-joined the Canterbury Rams. Following two solid seasons with the Rams in 2004 and 2005, Bush signed with the New Zealand Breakers for the 2005–06 Australian NBL season. However, his stint with the Breakers was short, as he was released by the club in November 2005 after appearing in just seven games.

For the 2006 New Zealand NBL season, Bush re-joined the Manawatu Jets. In 17 games for the Jets, he averaged 13.9 points, 5.9 rebounds and 1.3 assists per game.

Bush completed his career with a three-year stint with the Hawke's Bay Hawks between 2007 and 2009. He played in all 21 games for the Hawks in 2007, helping the club reach the grand final, where they lost 2–0 to the Nelson Giants in the best-of-three series. He averaged 5.2 points in those 21 games, a career low. In 2008, he appeared in 16 of the Hawks' 18 regular season games, averaging just 2.9 points and 2.1 rebounds per game. He also scored seven points in the team's quarter-final loss to the Nelson Giants. Bush went on to play in just six games for the Hawks in 2009, finishing his career having played in 206 NBL games.

Post-playing career
In September 2012, Bush was appointed as Basketball Hawkes Bay's Regional Development Coach, a role he served for three years. In January 2013, he took on the role of head coach at the Paul Henare and Paora Winitana Academy.

In April 2017, Bush joined the Hawke's Bay Hawks as an assistant coach for the remainder of the 2017 season.

Personal
Bush obtained New Zealand citizenship in 2004. Bush's father, the late Clifton Bush the First, also played basketball as a youth. Bush has two children, Maria and Clifton III.

References

External links
Clifton Bush at basketball.org.nz

1970 births
Living people
American expatriate basketball people in Argentina
American expatriate basketball people in Iceland
American expatriate basketball people in New Zealand
American men's basketball players
Basketball players from Arkansas
Breiðablik men's basketball players
Canterbury Rams players
Central Arkansas Bears basketball players
Estudiantes de Olavarría basketball players
Hawke's Bay Hawks players
New Zealand Breakers players
Manawatu Jets players
Þór Akureyri men's basketball players
Small forwards
Snæfell men's basketball players
Sportspeople from Little Rock, Arkansas
Úrvalsdeild karla (basketball) players
Vestri men's basketball players
Waikato Titans players